Tania James (born 1980) is an Indian American novelist.

Life
Born in Chicago, Illinois, James was raised in Louisville, Kentucky, and graduated from Harvard University with a BA in film making.  She received her Masters of Fine Arts from Columbia's School of the Arts in 2006.

Her first novel, Atlas of Unknowns (Knopf) was published in April 2009.  A family saga that alternates between Kerala, India and New York City. The novel was a San Francisco Chronicle Best Book of 2009 and a New York Times Editor's Choice. Atlas of Unknowns was shortlisted for the DSC Prize for South Asian Literature.  The foreign rights of Atlas of Unknowns have been sold in eight countries.

Her second book, Aerogrammes (Knopf) was published in May 2012. She has also written a number of short stories "The Other Gandhi" published in Guernica Magazine. "Girl Marries Ghost" a serialized short story in The Louisville Courier-Journal. "Hortense", a short story in Five Chapters.

James's novel, The Tusk That Did the Damage was published by Alfred A. Knopf in 2015. It was shortlisted for the Dylan Thomas Prize and longlisted for the Financial Times Oppenheimer Fund Emerging Voices Award.

Tania James lives in Washington, D.C. and teaches creative writing at the MFA program at George Mason University.

References

External links
 taniajames.com
 Interview with National Public Radio
 Review of Atlas of Unknowns in San Francisco Chronicle
 Span Magazine
 Atlas of Unknowns on Amazon.com

1980 births
Living people
American women writers
Harvard University alumni
Writers from Chicago
Writers from Louisville, Kentucky
Columbia University School of the Arts alumni
Kentucky women writers
21st-century American women